Gunabhooshana Cinkaiariyan was a king of the Aryacakravarti dynasty and he ruled over the Jaffna Kingdom in modern Sri Lanka. Yalpana Vaipava Malai indicates that he was the son of Martanda Cinkaiariyan. He was a popular king than his father due to his contribution on education, employment, etc. During his rule, the country was firm and steady.

Notes

Kings of Jaffna
Sri Lankan Tamil royalty